Stars Come Out may refer to:

"Stars Come Out", song by Stanley Super 800 from Louder & Clearer 2007
"Stars Come Out", song by ATB from Trilogy (ATB album)
"Stars Come Out", song by Calvin Harris from Ready for the Weekend (album)
"Stars Come Out", song by Zedd